ODS-Petrodata is a market intelligence company specialised in the upstream offshore oil and gas industry. ODS-Petrodata is considered an authoritative source for market intelligence, data, market research and consulting services. "ODS-Petrodata has been a leading provider of market intelligence and data to the offshore oil and gas industry [by association with its previous entities], since 1974"

History
ODS-Petrodata was founded in 2002 from the merger of Offshore Data Services Inc., Petrodata Ltd. and Bassoe Offshore Consultants Ltd., each a provider of "data, information and market intelligence to the offshore energy industry". ODS-Petrodata's website claims that their organisation has existed in some form since 1973. In the recent years, they also starting producing tools and publications oriented towards the offshore renewables market.

Locations
ODS-Petrodata operates from offices in Houston, Aberdeen, Oslo, Singapore and Dubai.

Acquisition
ODS-Petrodata was acquired by IHS Inc. in April 2011.

References

External links

Business intelligence companies
2011 mergers and acquisitions